Colombian singer and songwriter Shakira has released 11 studio albums, five live albums, two compilation albums, 68 singles (including 13 as a featured artist and 5 promotional singles) and 62 music videos (see Shakira videography). With estimated sales of 85 million records worldwide as of 2022 according to the recording academy, she is the highest-selling Colombian artist and the best-selling female Latin artist of all time. She is the only South American artist to peak at number one on the Australian Singles Chart, the UK Singles Chart, and the US Billboard Hot 100. Her singles "Hips Don't Lie" and "Waka Waka (This Time for Africa)", have achieved sales in excess of five million units, becoming some of the best-selling singles worldwide.

Shakira's musical career started at the age of 13 when she signed with Sony Music. Her first two studio albums, Magia and Peligro, were released in Colombia in 1991 and 1993 respectively. They performed poorly and had low sales, with the former selling fewer than 1000 copies. Fueled by the success of its lead single "Estoy Aquí", her next album Pies Descalzos (1996) became a success all across Latin America, receiving a diamond certification in Colombia. Her success in Latin America was consolidated by Dónde Están los Ladrones? (1998), which peaked atop the US Billboard Top Latin Albums chart. Like Pies Descalzos, it spawned numerous singles, including the popular "Ciega, Sordomuda". The album also spawned the top-ten hit "Ojos Así", which performed successfully in several European and Latin American countries. Dónde Están los Ladrones? is the ninth best-selling Latin album in the United States.

Motivated by Gloria Estefan, Shakira successfully crossed over into the English-language pop music scene with the release of the multi-platinum selling Laundry Service (2001) and its worldwide chart-toppers "Whenever, Wherever" and "Underneath Your Clothes". The album sold three million copies in six months of its release in the United States. By 2002, Laundry Service had sold more than four million copies across Europe and was declared the seventh best-selling album in the world in the same year by the International Federation of the Phonographic Industry (IFPI). Out of a total of 60 songs, Shakira selected 20 songs and divided them into two albums, the Spanish Fijación Oral, Vol. 1 and the English Oral Fixation, Vol. 2; both were released in 2005. The former opened at number four on the US Billboard 200 with first-week sales of 157,000 units—the highest debut of a full-length Spanish-language album in the country. It finished as the second best-selling Latin album of the decade and is the eighth best-selling Latin album in the United States. Its lead single "La Tortura" spent 25 non-consecutive weeks at number one on the US Billboard Hot Latin Songs chart. "La Tortura" held the record for longest-running number one single on the chart by nearly a decade, until it was succeeded by Enrique Iglesias's song "Bailando" in October 2014. Oral Fixation, Vol. 2 debuted within the top ten in most countries, although its sales began to decline in early 2006. Shakira's label Epic then reissued the album, adding its second single "Hips Don't Lie" to the track list; the song topped charts in 55 countries, including the UK Singles chart and the US Billboard Hot 100. One of the best-selling singles of the 21st century, "Hips Don't Lie" successfully revitalised sales of its parent album. Fijación Oral, Vol. 1 and Oral Fixation, Vol. 2 sold combined copies of over 12 million worldwide.

Shakira's eighth studio album, She Wolf (2009), deviated from her signature Latin pop and pop rock styles, instead exploring the electropop genre. It performed well in Europe and Latin America; in Mexico it was certified platinum and gold within a week of its release. However, it did not replicate its success in the United States, where it peaked at number 15 on the Billboard 200. Shakira was chosen to record the official song of the 2010 FIFA World Cup, "Waka Waka (This Time for Africa)", which was released in May 2010. It topped numerous record charts and was a multi-platinum selling single in Italy, Germany, Mexico, Spain and Switzerland. It was similarly successful in the United States, where it sold more than one million copies and was certified platinum. In the same year, her ninth studio album Sale el Sol was released. Preceded by the top ten hit "Loca", the bilingual album marked a musical return to Shakira's "roots" and retained her success in Europe and Latin America, being certified diamond in both Colombia and France. Inspired by her relationship with Spanish footballer Gerard Piqué and the birth of their son Milan Piqué Mebarak, her tenth studio album Shakira was released in 2014. It became her second consecutive diamond album in Colombia and debuted at number two on the US Billboard 200—her highest peak in the country for an album. It featured the top-ten hits "Can't Remember to Forget You" and "Dare (La La La)". Her eleventh studio album, El Dorado, was released in May 2017 and became her sixth album to reach number one on the US Billboard Top Latin Albums chart. Its lead single "Chantaje" featuring Maluma became an international success and received a 16-times platinum Latin certification from the RIAA.

Albums

Studio albums

Live albums

Compilation albums

Singles

As a lead artist

1990s

2000s

2010s

2020s

As a featured artist

Charity singles

Promotional singles

Other charted songs

Other appearances
{| class="wikitable plainrowheaders" style="text-align:center;"
|-
! scope="col" style="width:18em;"| Title
! scope="col"| Year
! scope="col"| Other artist(s)
! scope="col"| Album
|-
! scope="row"| "Underneath Your Clothes"
| rowspan="2"| 2002
| rowspan="2" 
| rowspan="2"| Laundry Service and Divas Las Vegas
|-
! scope="row"| "Always on My Mind"
|-
! scope="row"| "King and Queen"
| 2007
| Wyclef Jean
| Carnival Vol. II: Memoirs of an Immigrant
|-
! scope="row"| "Despedida"
| 2008
| 
| Love in the Time of Cholera
|-
! scope="row"| "La Maza"
| 2009
| Mercedes Sosa
| Cantora 1
|-
! scope="row"| "Todos Juntos"
| 2010
| Dora the Explorer 
| ''We Did It! Dora's Greatest Hits|}

FootnotesNotes for peak chart positions'''

See also

 List of best-selling music artists
 List of best-selling albums in Argentina
 List of best-selling albums in Colombia
 List of best-selling albums in Chile
 List of best-selling albums in France
 List of best-selling albums in Mexico
 List of best-selling albums in Portugal
 List of best-selling Latin albums in the United States
 List of best-selling albums of the 21st century
 List of best-selling remix albums
 Shakira videography
 Shakira songs

References

Discography
Latin pop music discographies
Pop music discographies
Discographies of Colombian artists